The following are the national public holidays of Costa Rica. Of the eleven days, nine are paid holidays and two are not.

Public holidays

Dates for moveable holidays

2020
 July 27 - Annexation of the Party of Nicoya to Costa Rica
 August 17 - Mother's Day
 September 14 - Independence Day
 November 30 - Army Abolition Day
2021
 May 3 - Labour Day
 July 26 - Annexation of the Party of Nicoya to Costa Rica
 September 13 - Independence Day
 November 29 - Army Abolition Day
2022
 September 19 - Independence Day
 December 5 - Army Abolition Day
2023
 April 10 - Juan Santamaría Day
 July 24 - Annexation of the Party of Nicoya to Costa Rica
 August 14 - Mother's Day
2024
 April 15 - Juan Santamaría Day
 July 29 - Annexation of the Party of Nicoya to Costa Rica
 August 19 - Mother's Day

References

 
Costa Rica
Costa Rican culture
Holidays